Christian Dissinger (born 15 November 1991) is a German handball player who plays for Al Duhail and the German national team.

Club career
Dissinger started his career at the German club TSG Friesenheim and played there until June 2011. After TSG Friesenheim was relegated he changed to the Swiss club Kadetten Schaffhausen. In March 2013, he gave his debut for Germany men's national handball team. In the Summer 2013 he moved to the Spanish club Atlético Madrid BM which announced their departure from Handball competitions in July 2013. After a long recovery from his second cross ligament rupture (May 2013) he came back for his new club TuS Nettelstedt-Lübbecke in April 2014. In the summer of 2015, he signed a contract for THW Kiel. He extended his contract in January 2016 until June 2020. In October 2018, Dissinger's contract was dissolved on mutual consent; later on he signed a contract with RK Vardar.

Achievements

Domestic competitions
RK Vardar
 Macedonian Handball Super League:
  Winner:  2018-19, 2020-21
 Macedonian Handball Cup:
  Winner:  2020-21
 DHB-Pokal:
  Winner:  2017

 DHB-Supercup:
  Winner:  2015

 Swiss Handball League:
  Winner:  2011-12

European competitions
RK Vardar
 EHF Champions League:
  Winner: 2018–19

Other competitions
 SEHA League:
  Winner:  2018–19

International
 Summer Olympics:
 : 2016
 European Championship:
 : 2016
 World Junior Championship:
 : 2011

References

External links 
 
 
 

1991 births
Living people
Sportspeople from Ludwigshafen
German male handball players
THW Kiel players
CS Dinamo București (men's handball) players
Handball-Bundesliga players
Olympic handball players of Germany
Handball players at the 2016 Summer Olympics
Medalists at the 2016 Summer Olympics
Olympic bronze medalists for Germany
Olympic medalists in handball
Expatriate handball players
German expatriate sportspeople in Spain
German expatriate sportspeople in Switzerland
Liga ASOBAL players
German expatriate sportspeople in North Macedonia
German expatriate sportspeople in Romania
21st-century German people